Muhammad Shameer Aziq Bin Abdul Razak (born 30 December 1995) is a Singapore international footballer who last played as a defender for S.League club Tampines Rovers.

Club career 

Shameer Aziq played for S.League club Hougang United before joining under-23 developmental side Courts Young Lions in 2014.

International career

Youth
Shameer Aziq represented Singapore U23 at the 2014 Asian Games.

Senior
Shameer was first called up to the national team against Papua New Guinea and Hong Kong in 2014. He made his senior international debut in the 92nd minute, replacing Fazrul Nawaz in a friendly match against Papua New Guinea on 6 September 2014. He made his second international cap a few days later against Hong Kong in a 0-0 draw.

Career statistics

Club 

. Caps and goals may not be correct.

International 

International caps

U23 International goals

References 

1995 births
Living people
Singaporean footballers
Singapore international footballers
Association football forwards
Hougang United FC players
Singapore Premier League players
Young Lions FC players
Footballers at the 2014 Asian Games
Asian Games competitors for Singapore